Angel Rock is a crime novel by Darren Williams, first published in 2002.

Plot summary
The novel is set against the backdrop of a fictional Australian bush town, Angel Rock, during the late 1960s.  The story concerns the investigation of two seemingly separate incidents: the disappearance of two young brothers (of who only one has returned home safely), and the suicide of a teenage girl in a derelict house in Sydney.

During the course of investigating the teenage girl's death, the detective chooses to go to the town and begins to believe that the two incidents might be linked in some way and he is forced to confront memories from his own past.

Publication history

External links 
A Review at RTÉ Entertainment

2002 Australian novels
Australian crime novels
Novels set in Australia